Patricia A. Walrath (born August 11, 1941, in Brainerd, Minnesota) is an American politician who represented the 3rd Middlesex District in the Massachusetts House of Representatives from 1985 to 2009, was a member of the Stow, Massachusetts, Board of Selectmen from 1980 to 1986, and the Stow Finance Committee from 1977 to 1980.

References

1941 births
Living people
People from Brainerd, Minnesota
Democratic Party members of the Massachusetts House of Representatives
People from Stow, Massachusetts
Bemidji State University alumni
State University of New York at Oswego alumni
Women state legislators in Massachusetts
Massachusetts city council members
Women city councillors in Massachusetts
21st-century American women